M. Moses is an Indian politician. He was elected to the Tamil Nadu legislative assembly from Nagercoil constituency as a Swatantra Party (SP) candidate in 1971, as an Indian National Congress (INC) candidate in 1989 and 1991, and as a candidate of the Tamil Maanila Congress (TMC) in 1996.

References 

Indian National Congress politicians from Tamil Nadu
Living people
Tamil Maanila Congress politicians
Tamil Nadu MLAs 1996–2001
Swatantra Party politicians
Year of birth missing (living people)
Tamil Nadu MLAs 1991–1996